The 1892 Kansas Jayhawks football team represented the University of Kansas in the Western Interstate University Football Association (WIUFA) during the 1892 college football season. In their first season under head coach A. W. Shepard, the Jayhawks compiled a 7–1 record (3–0 against conference opponents), won the conference championship, and outscored opponents by a combined total of 144 to 36. The Jayhawks played their home games at McCook Field in Lawrence, Kansas. John Kenzie was the team captain.

Schedule

References

Kansas
Kansas Jayhawks football seasons
Kansas Jayhawks football